The Australian Institute of Music (AIM) is an Australian private tertiary education provider, with campuses in Sydney, New South Wales and Melbourne, Victoria.

Founded in 1968, AIM delivers education for careers in the Australian music, entertainment and performing arts industries. Its music and performing arts courses offer accredited undergraduate and postgraduate studies in contemporary performance, classical performance, audio engineering, composition and music production, musical theatre, theatre performance and acting, arts and entertainment management.

The main AIM Sydney campus is located in Harrington Street, with the AIM Melbourne Campus located at King Street, Melbourne. Both campuses offer a wide range of music degrees and diplomas.

, there were 1,300 students enrolled at AIM.

Courses
The Australian Institute of Music offers a range of several courses for both undergraduate and postgraduate studies, including:

Undergraduate
Bachelor of Music – Audio
Bachelor of Music – Classical
Bachelor of Music – Contemporary
Bachelor of Music – Composition & Music Production
Diploma of Music
Bachelor of Music – Music Theatre
Bachelor of Music – Arts Management
Bachelor of Entertainment Management
Bachelor of Performance (Dramatic Arts)

Postgraduate
Masters of Music
Master of Arts & Entertainment Management

Productions and performances
Showcase events – Three times a year AIM stages its major Showcase events, featuring the talents of students across many of its departments collaborative performances, most recently in late 2018 with a performance of the 1974 Broadway musical The Wiz, an adaption of L. Frank Baum's The Wonderful Wizard of Oz.

AIM also regularly hosts performances from across a variety of disciplines.

Acquisitions
In 2006, AIM acquired the Australian Academy of Dramatic Arts (AADA) as part of its goal to create a performing arts university through the merger of multiple tertiary independent schools.

Notable alumni
 Balawan (born I Wayan Balawan; 1972) – musician and educator
 Vera Blue (born Celia Pavey; 1994) – Australian pop singer-songwriter
 Chris Brooks – Australian rock, metal and fusion guitarist
 Casey Donovan (born 1988) – winner of season 2 of Australian Idol
 Tamara Jaber (born 1982) – Australian recording artist
 Hannah Joy – Australian singer/songwriter and lead vocalist of Australian indie rock band Middle Kids
 Bianca Moon – composer for CBS-TV Hollywood's Bold and the Beautiful
 Amanda Palmer (born 1976) – director and journalist
 Palmy (born Eve Pancharoen; 1981) – Thai–Belgian pop singer
 The Preatures (formed 2010) – Australian indie rock band
 Isabella Manfredi – lead vocalist and keyboardist
 Jack Moffitt – guitarist
 Thomas Champion – bass guitarist
 Jackie Sannia – Australian singer and finalist on season 2 of The Voice Australia
 Chris Sorbello – Australian singer, songwriter and dancer
 Evgeny Ukhanov (born 1982) – Ukrainian–Australian pianist and winner of 3rd prize in the Sydney International Piano Competition in 2000
 Mark Vincent (born 1993) – Australian tenor
 Tarisai Vushe – Australian–Zimbabwe-born singer in the 2014 production of The Lion King
 Three Wishez – Australian band 
 Tiffani Wood (born 1977) – Australian singer-songwriter and former member of Bardot

See also
 Australian Institute of Music - Dramatic Arts#Notable alumni

References

External links

Australian Government GoingToUni website
 Australian Universities Quality Agency Audit Report

 
Music schools in Australia
Dance education in Australia
Drama schools in Australia
Film schools in Australia
Australian tertiary institutions
Education in Melbourne
Classical music in Australia
Education in Sydney
Educational institutions established in 1968
1968 establishments in Australia
Education in New South Wales